Levash is a rural locality (a village) in Medvedevskoye Rural Settlement, Totemsky District, Vologda Oblast, Russia. The population was 25 as of 2002.

Geography 
Levash is located 78 km northeast of Totma (the district's administrative centre) by road. Igmas is the nearest rural locality.

References 

Rural localities in Totemsky District